Lieutenant General William Hargrave (died 21 January 1751) was a British Army officer and Governor of Gibraltar.

Military career
Hargrave was commissioned into Viscount Charlemonte's Regiment of Foot in 1694. He fought with his regiment in the Low Countries from 1694 to 1696.

In 1702, during the War of the Spanish Succession, he fought at the Battle of Cádiz and the Battle of Vigo Bay; he was also present at the Siege of Barcelona in 1705 and at the Battle of Almansa in 1707.

He was also active at the Battle of Sheriffmuir in 1715 during the Jacobite rising. He was made colonel of the 31st Regiment of Foot in 1730. That same year he was instructed to proceed to Portsmouth and embark with reinforcements for Jersey where the Lieutenant Governor had failed to contain a riot.

In 1739 he became Colonel of The Royal Fusiliers just before he became Governor of Gibraltar in 1740.

He died in 1751 and is buried in Westminster Abbey.
His monument is by Roubiliac.

References

|-

|-

|-

1751 deaths
British Army lieutenant generals
Governors of Gibraltar
British military personnel of the War of the Spanish Succession
Burials at Westminster Abbey
East Surrey Regiment officers
People of the Jacobite rising of 1715
British military personnel of the Nine Years' War
Year of birth unknown